William Bramley (April 18, 1928 – October 28, 1985) was an American actor.

Biography
Born in New York, New York, Bramley graduated from Bucknell University in 1953. While there, he was involved with the Cap and Dagger Club theatrical organization.

Bramley made his film debut in the Academy Award-winning 1961 movie musical West Side Story, co-directed by Robert Wise and co-starring Richard Beymer. Bramley played the role of  policeman Officer Krupke. He also appeared in the 1968 film Madigan. Other film credits include Gunpoint (1966), I Love You, Alice B. Toklas (1968), Getting Straight (1970), Suppose They Gave a War and Nobody Came? (1970), Doctors' Wives (1971), Bless the Beasts & Children (1971), Hangup (1974), Revenge of the Cheerleaders (1976), and The Wild Life (1984).

He appeared in TV movies including Ready for the People (1964), Trial Run (1969), Michael O'Hara the Fourth (1972), The Last Day (1975), Tough Girl (1981).

Bramley played a number of characters in various TV series including the lead policeman in the second-season episode of the TV series Star Trek entitled "Bread and Circuses". Bramley made guest appearances on such TV series as Gunsmoke, Bonanza, Combat!, Straightaway, Kentucky Jones, Lassie (1969 episode "Patsy"),The Virginian, Bewitched, I Dream of Jeannie (as a policeman), Emergency!, McCloud, Gomer Pyle, and Barnaby Jones. His final television appearance was in an episode of St. Elsewhere.

Bramley died on October 28, 1985, in the Tarzana Medical Center in Tarzana, California, at the age of 57.

Filmography

Film

Television

References

External links 
 
 

1928 births
1985 deaths
American male film actors
American male television actors
20th-century American male actors